The Chevrolet Stovebolt engine is a straight-six engine made in two versions between 1929 and 1962 by the Chevrolet Division of General Motors.  It replaced the company's   inline-four as their sole engine offering from 1929 through 1954, and was the company's base engine starting in 1955 when it added the small block V8 to the lineup. It was completely phased out in North America by 1962, but GM continued to build it in Brazil until 1979. It was replaced by the Chevrolet Turbo-Thrift engine.

First generation: 1929–1936

"A six for the price of a four" 
The new six-cylinder engine was introduced in 1929 Chevrolet cars and trucks, replacing the company's first inline-4. The 1927 Chevrolet Series AA Capitol had sold very well—over a million units sold as compared to about 400,000 of Ford's Model T—but Ford had introduced a new model in the autumn of 1927: the Model A. The Model A, with its improved  four-cylinder, compared much more favourably to the  Series AA Capitol, and sales of the Model A surpassed Chevrolet by 1929. Chevrolet had been considering switching to a six-cylinder engine since 1925, and the ascendency of the Model A precipitated the switch. Chevrolet had long been known for its "valve-in-head" design in the previous four-cylinder engine, so General Manager William S. Knudsen and marketing executive Richard Grant insisted that the new six-cylinder design also use overhead valves. The new engine was mockingly called the "Cast-Iron Wonder" and "Stovebolt Six" for its seemingly old-fashioned design, but it was famously advertised as "a six for the price of a four" to great success: the Chevrolet was priced only $100 more than the Model A, and the brand regained the sales lead from Ford in 1931.

194
This engine used a forged steel crankshaft with three main bearings and cast-iron pistons.

This engine was used in all Chevrolet passenger cars from 1929 through 1932.

Applications:
 1929 Chevrolet Series AC International -  @ 2600 rpm,  @ 1000 rpm
 1930 Chevrolet Series AD Universal -  @ 2600 rpm,  @ 900 rpm
 1931 Chevrolet Series AE Independence -  @ 2600 rpm,  @ 800 rpm
 1932 Chevrolet Series BA Confederate -  @ 3000 rpm,  @ 800-2000 rpm

207

The original 194 CID engine was replaced with an improved  variant (the stroke was increased to ) in 1933, introduced in the Series CA Eagle. This newly revised engine put out , and was produced until 1936.

Toyota's first engine, the Type A produced from 1935 to 1947, was a reverse engineered copy of the  Chevrolet engine.

Applications:
 1933 Chevrolet Series CA Eagle / Master -  @ 2800 rpm,  @ 1000-1800 rpm
 1933 Chevrolet Series CB/OA/OB/OC/OD Commercial Utility -  @ 2750 rpm,  @ 1000 rpm
 1934 Chevrolet Series DA Master -  @ 3300 rpm,  @ 800-2200 rpm
 1934 Chevrolet Series DB/PA/PB/PC/PD Commercial Utility -  @ 3000 rpm,  @ 1000 rpm
 1935 Chevrolet Series EA/ED Master -  @ 3200 rpm,  @ 1000-2000 rpm
 1935 Chevrolet Series EB/QA/QB/QC/QD Commercial Utility -  @ 3200 rpm,  @ 1000-1400 rpm
 1935 Chevrolet Series EC Standard -  @ 3200 rpm,  @ 1000-2000 rpm
 1936 Chevrolet passenger cars -  @ 3200 rpm,  @ 900-2000 rpm
 1936 Chevrolet trucks -  @ 3200 rpm,  @ 900-1500 rpm

181
A  version was also introduced in 1933, in the lower priced Series CC Standard, and used again in the 1934 Series DC Standard. The compression ratio in the 1933 model was 5.2:1, and was increased to 5.35:1 in 1934. Production of this version ended after 1934, and the Standard used the 206.8 cubic inch engine thereafter.

Second generation: 1937–1962

The Stovebolt engine was significantly re-engineered for the 1937 model year, distinguished from the earlier 1929-1936 engines by having a redesigned crankcase with four main bearings in lieu of the older engine's three bearings. It is often known as the "Blue Flame" engine, although that name was only officially applied beginning in 1953, and then only for the 235ci version coupled to the Powerglide automatic transmission (including in the Corvette).

216
This generation did not use a fully pressurized oiling system. The connecting rods were oiled using an "oil trough" built into the oil pan that had spray nozzles that squirted a stream of oil at the connecting rods (which were equipped with "dippers"), thus supplying oil to the rod bearings.

Rod bearings were made of babbitt cast integral with the rod. The bearing was adjustable for wear by removing copper shims placed between the rod cap and connecting rod. In this way specified oil clearance could be maintained. 

This engine was also used in GM's British Bedford truck. In the late 1930s rival Austin decided to get into the 2-3 ton truck ("lorry") market and in a crash program based the design on the basic architecture of this "Stove Bolt" engine, except that they added detachable shell main and con-rod bearings and pressurized lubrication. That Austin engine, in six-cylinder form, post war known as the Austin D-Series, went on to power cars such as the Austin Sheerline and Princess, and the Jensen Interceptor and 541. Austin also lopped off two cylinders to create the BS1 engine and in that form various versions, with various capacities, powered cars such as the Austin 16, A70 Hampshire and Hereford, A90 Atlantic, the Austin-Healey 100-4 and the Austin Gipsy, a generation of commercial vans, as well as some models of the iconic London black taxi (FX3 and FX4).

235

In 1941 a  version of the 216 engine was introduced for use in large trucks. Both the bore and stroke of ( were increased over the 216. This engine also had an oil "dipper system" as described above, in reference to the oiling system, as in the 216.

The 235 was introduced to the Chevy passenger car line in 1950, coupled to the new Powerglide automatic transmission, and 3.55:1 rear differential. The new version used with the Powerglide transmission featured hydraulic lifters and larger intake valves to produce more power. The pushrod cover on the side of the engine also no longer extended across the cylinder head, to eliminate oil leaks. In 1953 the 235 engine became standard equipment in all Chevrolet passenger cars (except the sedan delivery body, which continued to use the older 216 until 1954), but when coupled to the standard three-speed manual transmission (called Thrift-King in that guise) it featured solid lifters and lower power output:  versus  with the Powerglide.

A fully pressurized lubrication system with shell type main bearings in lieu of poured babbitt and aluminum pistons were also introduced in 1953, but only in the higher-output Blue Flame version in cars ordered with the Powerglide transmission. The alleged benefits of a "blue flame" rather than yellow had been touted in Chevrolet advertising since 1934. The 1953 Corvette used a unique version of the high-pressure 235 engine with mechanical lifters, the same slightly higher-lift camshaft as used in the 261 truck engine and three single-barrel, side-draft Carter Model YH carburetors to produce .

From 1954 to 1962, the high-pressure 235 engine with solid lifters was used in some trucks. From 1956 to 1962, all 235 engines used in cars had hydraulic lifters.

The 235 is known as one of the great Chevrolet engines, noted for its power and durability. It was replaced by the third generation 230, beginning in 1962.

Canadian-production GMC trucks also used the 216 and 235 Chevrolet straight-six engines as their base light-duty truck powerplant in the late 1940s and early 1950s. The 216 was used from 1947 to 1953, and the 235 was used in 1954 light-duty trucks only. Medium-duty GMC trucks used US built GMC engines in the 248, 270, and up sizes prior to 1954.

261
In 1954, a  truck engine was introduced as an optional Jobmaster engine for heavy-duty trucks. This engine was offered as a step up from the 235 starting in 1954. It was offered in parallel with the GMC V6 engine in 1960 until 1963, when it was discontinued. The 261 US truck engine had mechanical lifters and was available from 1954 to 1962.

The 235 and 261 truck engines were also used by GMC Truck of Canada (GMC truck 6-cylinder engines were also used in Canada). The 1955–1962 Canadian full-size Pontiac car had a standard 261-cubic-inch engine that had hydraulic lifters. This engine was not sold in the US, but was very similar to the US truck 261.

The 261 engines were also used in light trucks and the Chevrolet Veraneio from 1958 to 1979 in Brazil. Produced 148hp.

See also
 Chevrolet Turbo-Thrift engine
 List of GM engines
 Chevrolet Straight-4 engine
 General Motors Atlas engine#LL8 (Vortec 4200)
 Duramax I6 engine

References

FAQ Stovebolt.com — What is a Stovebolt?
Chevrolet "Stovebolt" Six by Jack Nerad — The story of the Chevrolet "Stovebolt" Six.
Classic definition of a Stovebolt — by the Mid State Antique Stock Car Club

External links
Sheridan's 1946 Chevy Truck — 1941–46 Chevrolet truck photos; much information.
Stovebolt.com — Online information resource and discussion forums for pre-'73 Chevrolet & GMC trucks.
chevytrucks.org — Specializing in information on 1941–59 Chevrolet trucks; how-to articles, pictures, history, etc.
"The Art Deco Series" — This site is dedicated to the history and preservation of the Chevrolet & GMC commercial haulers that were produced just before, during, and just after World War II, 1941–46.
OldTruckNetwork.com — The No. ? online information resource for old trucks and politics.

Straight-6
Straight-6
Straight-six engines